184314 Mbabamwanawaresa, provisional designation , is a mid-sized trans-Neptunian object in the classical Kuiper belt, perhaps 300 km across, discovered in 2005.

References

External links 
 

184314
Discoveries by Marc Buie
Named minor planets
20050311